Usmar is both a given name and a surname. Notable people with the name include:

 Usmar Ismail (1921–1971), Indonesian film director
 Victor Darley-Usmar (born 1956), English biologist and biochemist
 William Usmar (1812–1879), English cricket player